Mukhriddin Khasanov ((), born 23 September 2002) is a Tajik professional football player who plays for FC Istiklol.

Career

Club
In February 2021, Khasanov joined Istiklol on trial, signing for the club permanently on 29 March 2021.

International
Khasanov made his senior team debut on 1 June 2022 in a 1–0 defeat against Syria, coming on as a second-half substitute for Rustam Yatimov.

Career statistics

Club

International

Statistics accurate as of match played 1 June 2022

Honors
Istiklol
 Tajikistan Higher League (2): 2021, 2022
 Tajik Supercup (2): 2021, 2022

Tajikistan
King's Cup: 2022

References

External links
 

2002 births
Living people
Tajikistani footballers
Tajikistan international footballers
FC Istiklol players
Association football goalkeepers
Tajikistan Higher League players